Frank Ingels (January 2, 1886 – April 26, 1957) was an American sculptor. His work was part of the sculpture event in the art competition at the 1932 Summer Olympics.

References

1886 births
1957 deaths
20th-century American sculptors
20th-century American male artists
American male sculptors
Olympic competitors in art competitions
People from Seward County, Nebraska
Sculptors from Nebraska